The Tauhoa River is an estuarial arm of the Kaipara Harbour in the Auckland Region of New Zealand's North Island. As part of the harbour's drowned valley system, it consists of narrow channels flowing south through expanses of mudflat to meet with the main waters of the Kaipara due east of the harbour entrance. The Tauhoa Channel links the entrance with the river mouth.

History

In pre-European times, the Tauhoa River was important to the Tāmaki Māori people of the Kaipara Harbour. The Opou portage allowed waka to be transported across the Okahukura Peninsula between the Oruawharo and Tauhoa rivers.

See also
List of rivers of New Zealand

References

Rodney Local Board Area
Rivers of the Auckland Region
Kaipara Harbour catchment